Timothy Mark Vine (born 4 March 1967) is an English comedian, actor, writer, and presenter best known for his one-liners and his role on the sitcom Not Going Out (2006–2014). He has released a number of stand-up comedy specials and has written several joke books.

From 2004 to 2014, Vine held the Guinness World Record for the most jokes told in an hour; each joke had to get a laugh from the audience to count towards the total, and he set the new record with 499 jokes. In both 2010 and 2014, he won the award for best joke at the Edinburgh Festival Fringe and was the runner-up for the three years in between.

Early life
Timothy Mark Vine was born in the Cheam suburb of London on 4 March 1967, the son of Diana (née Tillett), a housewife and occasional doctor's receptionist, and Guy Vine (died 2018), a lecturer in civil engineering at North East Surrey College of Technology. He is the younger brother of broadcaster Jeremy Vine and the older brother of artist Sonya Vine. He was educated in Surrey, attending Lynton Prep in Ewell, Aberdour School in Burgh Heath, and Epsom College in Epsom.

Career

Stand-up
Vine's stand-up act consists primarily of a series of quick-fire one-liners and puns, along with silly songs and a bagful of props.

Vine and a security guard from his office job in Croydon started doing open mic nights as a hobby. 
During 1991, Tim Vine regularly honed his routine at the Comedy Café in London, adding other clubs throughout 1992. He came second in the Hackney Empire New Act competition in 1993. Vine quit his job to go on tour as a support act for Boothby Graffoe, who later wrote additional material for The Sketch Show. Vine became a regular on the London comedy circuit by 1994, trying a variety of comedy styles. He realised one-liners were a good way forward after the audience's positive reaction to his joke: "So I went to the doctors. He said, 'You've got hypochondria'. I said, 'Not that as well!'" Vine built up this repertoire, before making his first TV appearance on BBC One's Pebble Mill.

In 1996, Vine met Lee Mack at the Comedy Lounge in Kingston-Upon-Hull. Mack was competing in The Gong Show, where up to ten comedians try to last for a full five minute slot, hoping to beat the Gong and not get voted off by the public. Mack inadvertently did a couple of Vine's jokes, to which the audience shouted "Tim Vine". When Mack came off stage, he asked a man who Tim Vine was, and got the reply "He plays here quite a bit." The man was Tim Vine. The pair later worked together on The Sketch Show, Not Going Out and Let's Play Darts for Comic Relief.

The comedian has regularly appeared at the Edinburgh Festival Fringe, with shows such as The Tim Vine Shambles and The Tim Vine Fiasco (1995) - which won him the Perrier Newcomer Award - then Tim Vine Flat Out (1998), I'm Vine Thanks and Tim Vine and the Minotaur (1999). In 2006, he had a large advertising hoarding erected featuring his name and image, with a small sub-heading "...is not appearing at this year's Edinburgh Festival." Vine appeared at the Pleasance Courtyard for the first two weeks of the 2008 Edinburgh Festival Fringe performing a show entitled Punslinger.

He appeared at the Christian festival, Spring Harvest, in 2007, 2008 and 2013 alongside John Archer at Skegness and Minehead, and at the Cambridge Theatre in May 2007 for a show entitled Tim Vine, Live in Concrete.

 
Vine's UK comedy tours include Current Puns (2006) and Punslinger (2008). In July 2008, he recorded a performance at the Bloomsbury Theatre in London, which was released as a new DVD entitled So I Said To This Bloke... on 27 October 2008. His third tour, The Joke-amotive, took place during February and March 2010, with a DVD of the show released in November 2011. Vine's Tim Timinee Tim Timinee Tim Tim to You tour recording was released in 2016, followed by Sunset Milk Idiot (2019). Vine's support act is usually Britain's Got Talent's comedy magician John Archer.

In a BBC Radio Wales interview with Behnaz Akhgar (12 October 2021), Vine revealed that he had intended to perform a new stand-up show at the 2020 Edinburgh Fringe but this was delayed until at least 2022 due to the covid pandemic.  

Many of Vine's jokes have been falsely attributed to Tommy Cooper, many being in Cooper's style; the West End show about Cooper actually features some of Vine's jokes.

Panto
2005/2006 - Dandini in Cinderella (New Wimbledon Theatre) with Susan Hampshire, Richard Wilson, Naomi Wilkinson, John Barrowman, Peter Duncan.
2006/2007 - Silly Billy in Jack and the Beanstalk (Richmond Theatre) with John Challis, Sue Holderness, Aled Jones.
2009/2010 - Muddles in Snow White and the Seven Dwarfs (Richmond Theatre).
2010/2011 - Jangles in  Sleeping Beauty (Richmond Theatre) with Anita Dobson replacing Brian Blessed who was unwell.
2012/2013 - Wishee Washee in Aladdin (Richmond Theatre).
2014/2015 - Buttons in Cinderella (New Wimbledon Theatre) with Linda Gray, Matthew Kelly, Wayne Sleep.
2016/2017 - Idle Jack in Dick Whittington (New Wimbledon Theatre) with Matthew Kelly, Arlene Phillips.
2019/2020 - Buttons in Cinderella (Fairfield Halls, Croydon) with Ore Oduba, Cat Sandion.

Music
Vine's musical talents, aside from the comedy songs in his act, include playing the guitar, bass, piano and drums.

He occasionally plays the drums at his church. He was in several bands, including alongside his brother Jeremy in The Flared Generation, which Smash Hits magazine described as "the most unfashionable punk band in the country.

Vine has released three novelty music albums, Pretend Popstar - Fake Hits, Dance Floor Gridlock and Angus Crunch and the Nepali Flautist.

Vine is a huge Elvis Presley fan, and has been since Elvis died in 1977; he has a picture of the rock and roll legend in every room at home.  The megastar was Vine’s Specialist Subject on Celebrity Mastermind and his inspiration for performing to Viva Las Vegas on Comic Relief Does Fame Academy. In August 2019, Vine’s Plastic Elvis tribute act was a sell-out at the Edinburgh Fringe. On 6 January 2020, Plastic Elvis was the Dictionary Corner Guest on Countdown, plugging the 2020 UK tour, which was later postponed due to the COVID-19 pandemic and rescheduled for autumn 2021 through spring 2022. Although promotional material states "This is NOT a stand up comedy show", Vine's regular support act comic/magician John Archer plays Big Buddy Holly. David Martin, who wrote four of the show’s Elvis numbers, sings a duet with Plastic. Music is performed by The High Noon Band (UK) with backing vocals by Josie Quinn Abraham.

In May 2020, when the Eurovision Song Contest was cancelled due to the covid pandemic, Vine competed in the Isolation Song Contest representing Romania with his home-filmed, self-composed entry Room Mania. John Archer also made several appearances in shots from his own house. The event raised around £40,000 for the homeless charity Crisis, Refuge (which supports female domestic abuse survivors) and The Trussell Trust food banks.

Podcasts and YouTube
In December 2007, Vine launched his first podcast, 'Tim Vine Celebrates'. The first episode "Tim Vine Celebrates... Christmas" was released for free on 19 December and includes many previously unheard jokes and humorous songs, as well as an array of comedy characters, mostly voiced by himself.

In autumn 2019, Vine premiered his YouTube channel Tim Vine TeleVisual (TVTV), releasing a short video of sketches every Monday evening for over a year. Additional videos include Recreating Columbo, predominantly filmed in Vine’s home during the pandemic. Vine reprised his Columbo on Countdown, dressing as and impersonating the dishevelled detective in his guest spot (3 February 2022). Further instalments, based on season one, form part of Vine’s YouTube channel content for 2022.

Similarly, Vine also contributed scenes to the 2020 international project Jaws We Make, along with over 100 other superfans of Jaws. The entire movie was recreated using a variety of amateur/professional production methods and released on YouTube to celebrate the blockbuster’s 45th anniversary. The previous year, Jaws was Vine’s Specialist Subject on his second Celebrity Mastermind appearance.

Television

Tim Vine’s first TV appearance was on BBC One‘s Pebble Mill in 1994.

In autumn 1995, Vine hosted BBC One morning quiz Housemates, featuring an endgame called Up The Garden Path. The show ran for one season of 25 episodes.

Vine was the first man to appear on Channel 5, alongside Julia Bradbury and  the Spice Girls, when the network launched on 30 March 1997. The following day, game show Whittle premiered with Vine as host for two seasons March–June and September–December.

From May to August 1997, Vine presented the Channel 4 game show Fluke which he devised. The warm-up comedian was Lee Mack.

Tim hosted Fort Boyard Takes on the World in 2004.

From 2001 to 2004, Vine co-wrote/starred in both series of ITV's The Sketch Show with Lee Mack. Additional material was written by Vine’s good friend and tour support act, John Archer and, on occasion, Boothby Graffoe and Tim’s sister Sonya Vine.

From 2006 to 2012, Vine played Timothy Gladstone Adams in Lee Mack’s BBC One sitcom Not Going Out. He returned for a cameo in the Christmas 2014 episode and the series 7 finale as Lee's best man.

Since 2009, Vine has made appearances on Countdown as a guest in Dictionary Corner.

In 2012, Vine hosted one series of teatime game show Don't Blow the Inheritance for ITV.

Vine faced “The Beast” Mark Labbett on The Chase in 2012 and 2021 (series 11, episode 10).

Replacing Mark Williams, Vine portrayed Sebastian Beach in the second and final season of BBC One’s comedy Blandings (2013-2014), based on the books by P. G. Wodehouse.

In 2014 and 2015, Vine appeared in the revival of Celebrity Squares as resident comedian alongside Joe Wilkinson.

In 2017, he appeared in two episodes of Tim Vine Travels Through Time on BBC One. Regular cast members included Sally Phillips, Mandeep Dhillon, Marek Larwood and John Archer. Special guests included Emma Bunton and Ore Oduba, the latter starring with Vine in the 2019/2020 Cinderella panto at Fairfield Halls, Croydon.

In mid 2018, Vine was a celebrity contestant in 10 episodes of Taskmaster series 6, on Dave. His improvisations included measuring a piece of string with a plastic lobster.

In autumn 2018, Vine hosted ITV quiz show Football Genius.

Tim Vine has participated in several Comic Relief / Sport Relief charity competitions. In Comic Relief Does Fame Academy Vine performed his pop hero Elvis Presley’s hit Viva Las Vegas (2007) and on Let's Dance for Comic Relief (2013), Vine was talked out of Elvis and given Justin Timberlake’s Rock Your Body, making it to the final. In 2015, he was runner-up in Let's Play Darts, losing out to Lee Mack. Vine returned in 2016 to win it, beating Mike Tindall in the final. For the 2021 telethon, Vine’s contribution was Joke In A Box, entertaining military personnel who had assisted medical centres during the COVID-19 pandemic. For 2022, Vine competed against Kiri Pritchard-McLean in One Red Nose and Their Dog with training shown on Countryfile (6 March) and the finale broadcast on Comic Relief night (18 March). Filmed at Penrhyn Castle, Wales, this is a variation on the long-running televised competition One Man and His Dog.

Radio and audiobooks
BBC Radio 4 airs The Tim Vine Chat Show, where members of the audience are interviewed, having filled in a form before the show if they wish to be considered for selection.  Vine presented one series of four episodes in July 2016, and a Christmas edition on 26 December 2016. A second series of six episodes was broadcast in September and October 2017. Additional Festive and Summer specials aired in 2018 and 2019. The series and specials are available on BBC Sounds and via audiobook (released April 2020). The Tim Vine Christmas Chat Show 2021 was recorded on 30th November at The CryerArts Centre, airing 23 December. 

In 2017, Tim Vine Travels Through Time was broadcast on BBC Radio 2, before moving to BBC One for two televised episodes.

Vine’s Punslinger audiobook is slightly shorter than the DVD version, as some of the visual jokes are omitted.

Books
In 2003, Vine contributed to the Sit-Down Comedy book, but his first book was released in 2010 entitled The Biggest Ever Tim Vine Joke Book containing over 1,000 jokes and puns. Then, in 2011, Vine released a second joke book entitled The Not Quite Biggest Ever Tim Vine Joke Book, specifically for children.

 2010 - The Biggest Ever Tim Vine Joke Book
 2011 - The (Not Quite) Biggest Ever Tim Vine Joke Book: Children's Edition
 2013 - The Tim Vine Bumper Book of Silliness: Daft Jokes, Crazy Pictures, Utter Nonsense

Awards

BAFTA
Vine's ensemble series The Sketch Show won the BAFTA for Best Comedy Programme in 2002.

Fringe awards
In August 2010, Vine won the prize for the funniest joke of that year's Edinburgh Fringe, following a public vote from a judged shortlist. His winning joke was "I've just been on a once-in-a-lifetime holiday. I'll tell you what, never again."

On 25 August 2011, Vine won the prize for the second funniest joke at the Edinburgh Fringe festival. His joke was "Crime in multi-storey car parks. That is wrong on so many different levels." He was beaten by Nick Helm. In 2012 Vine again came second with the joke "Last night me and my girlfriend watched three DVDs back to back. Luckily I was the one facing the telly." He was beaten by Stewart Francis. In 2013 Vine came fourth with the joke "My friend told me he was going to a fancy dress party as an Italian island. I said to him 'Don't be Sicily'." The winner was Rob Auton.

Vine won the award for the second time in 2014 with the joke "I decided to sell my Hoover... well it was just collecting dust."

World record
On 7 October 2004, Vine broke the Guinness World Record for the most jokes told in an hour with 499, beating the previous record of 362 by Estonian Erkki Kolu. Each joke had to get a laugh from the paying audience to count towards the total. The record was subsequently broken on two occasions by Anthony Lehmann and Korukonda Ranga Rao, but Guinness later decided both performers had breached guidelines by using cue cards, so Vine was reinstated. He held the record until November 2014, when Australian comedian Taylor Goodwin, inspired by Vine, told 550 jokes.

Personal life
Vine lives in Banstead, Surrey. He is a practising Anglican, and has performed at Spring Harvest Christian festivals.

Vine is a supporter of football team Sutton United FC, stating that the first of the team's games he attended was an FA Cup match against Middlesbrough FC during the 1987–88 season. He is also a keen darts fan, having attended several Professional Darts Corporation tournaments along with Lee Mack. Some of these were televised, such as the 2011 World Championships when both Vine and Mack appeared in the crowd. He also plays darts in his spare time. On 31 December 2020, during a live Twitter broadcast, Vine scored 170 in darts in front of a large online audience.

Filmography

Television

Guest appearances

In quiz show celebrity specials, Vine often plays for Cure Parkinson's, because of his father, Guy Vine, who died with the illness in August 2018.

Stand-up DVDs
Live (29 November 2004)
Live – So I Said To This Bloke... (27 October 2008)
Punslinger Live (22 November 2010)
The Joke-a-motive Live (21 November 2011)
Tim Timinee Tim Timinee Tim Tim to You (28 November 2016)
Sunset Milk Idiot Live (25 November 2019)

Feature-length films 
Vine has made two films, though these have not yet been widely released – Library Altitude Zero and FearMoth. The latter was shown at the Brighton film festival in 2017. FearMoth was added to the Tim Vine Televisual YouTube channel on 14 April 2020, during the UK’s first Covid lockdown, around the time Vine’s Plastic Elvis tribute would have toured.

References

External links

 
 Tim Vine official website
 The British Sitcom Guide on Not Going Out

1967 births
English Christians
English Anglicans
English male comedians
English television presenters
Living people
People from Cheam
People educated at Aberdour School
People educated at Epsom College
20th-century English comedians
21st-century English comedians